was a Japanese composer and conductor.

Name
In many Western reference books, his name is given as Kôsçak Yamada. During his music study in Berlin from 1910 to 1913, he became annoyed when people laughed at him because the normal transliteration of his first name 'Kōsaku' sounded like the Italian cosa ('what?' or 'thing') plus the German Kuh ('cow'); therefore he chose the transliteration 'Kôsçak Yamada'.

Biography
Born in Tokyo, Yamada started his music education at Tokyo Music School in 1904, studying there under German composers  and Heinrich Werkmeister. In 1910, he left Japan for Germany where he enrolled at the Prussian Academy of Arts and learnt composition under Max Bruch and Karl Leopold Wolf and piano under Carl August Heymann-Rheineck, before returning to Japan in late 1913. He travelled to the United States in 1918 for two years. During his stay in Manhattan, New York City, he conducted a temporarily-organized orchestra composed of members of New York Philharmonic and New York Symphony, short before their amalgamation.

Yamada composed about 1,600 pieces of musical works, in which art songs (Lieder) amount to 700 even excluding songs commissioned by schools, municipalities and companies. The songs were performed and recorded by many famous singers such as Kathleen Battle, Ernst Haefliger and Yoshikazu Mera. His opera Kurofune (black ships) is regarded as one of the most famous Japanese operas. His work was heard at the music section of the art competition at the 1936 Summer Olympics.

As a conductor, Yamada made an effort to introduce western orchestral works to Japan. He premiered in Japan of Debussy's Prélude à l'après-midi d'un faune, Dvořák's Symphony No. 9, Gershwin's An American in Paris, Mosolov's Iron Foundry, Sibelius' Finlandia, Shostakovich's Symphony No. 1, Johann Strauss II's An der schönen blauen Donau, and Wagner's Siegfried Idyll.

Jacques Ibert's Ouverture de fête was dedicated to the Japanese emperor and government for the 2,600th National Foundation Day in 1940 and premiered under the baton of Yamada.

Yamada died at his home in Tokyo of a heart attack on 29 December 1965, and was survived by his wife, Teruko.

Major compositions
Operas
Ayame [Iris] (1931)
Kurofune [Black Ships] (1940)
Hsìang-fei (1946) (four acts, seven scenes with a proemnia – see Xiang Fei)

Other stage works
Maria Magdalena for ballet, after the drama by M. Maeterlinck (1916) (piano sketches were complete, but are now lost; the sketches were never developed)

Orchestral works
Overture in D major (1912)
Symphony in F major "Triumph and Peace" (1912)
Kurai Tobira, symphonic poem (1913)
Madara No Hana, symphonic poem (1913)
Choreographic Symphony 'Maria Magdalena'  (1918) (written from sketches for a ballet; first performed in Carnegie Hall)
Sinfonia "Inno Meiji" (1921)
Nagauta Symphony "Tsurukame" for voice, shamisen and orchestra (1934)

Chamber works
String Quartet No. 1 in F major
String Quartet No. 2 in G major 
String Quartet No. 3 in C minor
Hochzeitsklänge for piano quintet (1913)
Chanson triste japonaise for violin and piano (1921)
Suite japonaise for violin and piano (1924)
Variations on Kono-michi for flute and piano (1930)

Works for piano
New Year's Eve (1903)
Variationen (1912)
The Chimes of the Dawn (1916)
Les poèmes à Scriabin (1917)
Karatachi-no-hana for piano solo (1928)

Choral works
Die Herbstfeier for mixed chorus and orchestra (1912)

Songs
"Song of Aiyan" (1922)
"Chugoku chihō no komoriuta" [Lullaby from the Chugoku Area]
"Karatachi no hana"
"Pechika"
"" [This Road]
"Akatombo" [Red Dragonfly] (1927)
"Yuu-in"
"Sabishiki Yoruno Uta" [Songs of Lonely Night] (1920)

Recordings
 Yamada Kosak Memorial Album – Quince Blossoms – Columbia BLS-4001 (1966?)
 "Aka Tombo" recorded by Jean-Pierre Rampal (flute) and Ensemble Lunaire, Japanese Folk Melodies transcribed by Akio Yashiro, CBS Records, 1978
 Kósçak Yamada, Overture in D major, Symphony in F major 'Triumph and Peace', and symphonic poems The Dark Gate and Madara No Hana, Ulster Orchestra and New Zealand Symphony Orchestra, dir. Takuo Yuasa. Naxos, 2004
 Kósçak Yamada, Nagauta Symphony "Tsurukame", Inno Meiji, Maria Magdalena, Tokyo Metropolitan Symphony Orchestra, dir. Takuo Yuasa. Naxos, 2007

References

Further reading
 Herd, Judith Ann. 1996. "Westliche Musik und die Entstehung einer japanischen Avantgarde", translated by Annemarie Guignard and Elisabeth Seebass. In Musik in Japan: Aufsätze zu Aspekten der Musik im heutigen Japan, edited by Silvain Guignard, 219–40. Munich: Iudicium, 1996. 
 Pacun, David. 2006. "Thus we cultivate our own World, thus we share it with others: Kósçak Yamada's Visit to the United States, 1918–19", American Music 24/1, 67–94.
 Pacun, David. 2008. "Style and Politics in Kosaku Yamada's Folk Song Arrangements, 1917–1950." In Music of Japan Today edited by E. Michael Richards and Kazuko Tanosaki, (Cambridge Scholars Publishing, 2008), 39–54.
  (subscription access)
 "Yamada Kōsaku", Encyclopædia Britannica

External links

1886 births
1965 deaths
19th-century Japanese male musicians
20th-century classical composers
20th-century classical pianists
20th-century conductors (music)
20th-century Japanese composers
20th-century Japanese male musicians
20th-century Japanese pianists
Japanese classical composers
Japanese classical pianists
Japanese conductors (music)
Japanese male classical composers
Japanese male classical pianists
Japanese male conductors (music)
Japanese music educators
Japanese opera composers
Japanese Romantic composers
Male opera composers
Musicians from Tokyo
Olympic competitors in art competitions
Recipients of the Legion of Honour
Tokyo Music School alumni